David Solomon Eibeschutz (Hebrew: דוד שלמה אייבשיץ) (alternate English: David Shlomo Eibeschitz) was born in Ozeriany, Polish–Lithuanian Commonwealth (now in Ternopil Oblast, Ukraine) in 1755.

Biography
His father's name was Yerachmiel. He was a Russian-born rabbi and author, a pupil of Rabbi Moses Tzvi Heller, the author of Geon Tzvi. He was the first Rabbi of the shtetl of Chorostkov, Polish–Lithuanian Commonwealth (now Khorostkiv, Ukraine). From 1790 to 1800, he occupied the position of Rabbi in Bodzanov (now Budaniv, Ukraine). Thereafter, he served as the Rabbi for Soroki, Bessarabia (now Soroca, Moldova), and in Jassy (now Iaşi, Romania). From Iasi, he made aliyah and went to the Land of Israel in 1810 and remained in Safed until his death on 19 November 1813.

He was the author of many kabalistic and Talmudical works, which still exist in manuscript. He also wrote Levushei Serad, in two parts. The first part contains a commentary on the Shulchan Aruch, Orach Chayim, with comments on David ben Samuel's Turei Zahav and Abraham Abele Gumbiner's Magen Avraham; at the end of this part is added the plan of the Temple as described by Ezekiel (Mohilev, 1818, and frequently reprinted). The second part is on Shulchan Aruch, Yoreh De'ah (Mohilev, 1812). His Ne'ot Deshe is a compilation of 138 responsa, in two parts, the first of which was published in Lemberg, 1861, while the second is in manuscript. Arvei Nachal is also in two parts, the first being a treatise on the Pentateuch, the second consisting of sermons (Kopust, Sdilkov, 1835; Krotoschin, 1840; Jitomir, 1850; Lemberg, 1856).

Jewish Encyclopedia bibliography
Eliezer Kohn, Kin'at Soferim, p. 90;
Fuenn, Ḳiryah Ne'emanah, p. 223;
Benjacob, Oẓar ha-Sefarim, pp. 255, 391, 449.

Footnotes

References

family records

External links
 English translation of the Arvei Nachal

1755 births
1813 deaths
19th-century rabbis from the Russian Empire
18th-century Polish–Lithuanian rabbis
Rabbis in Ottoman Galilee
Bessarabian Jews
Rabbis in Safed
Hasidic rebbes